The Matchmaker is a 2018 short drama film directed by Leonora Pitts.

Synopsis 
Sam is concerned that Flora, his elderly mother, is not getting the mental stimulation she needs to stave off dementia. When she moved into a retirement community, he decides to find her an ideal best friend to talk to, and keep her mind occupied. His entry into the lives of various residents in the community has unexpected results - some funny, and some heartbreaking.

Cast 
 Barbara Bain: Sarah
 Rhea Perlman: Irene
 Robert Romanus: Sam
 Bryna Weiss: Flora

Awards 
 2018: Women Over 50 Film Festival - Best Drama
 2018: Dam Short Film Festival:  Best of the Fest Audience Award

Official selection - Select festival screenings 
 Newport Beach Film Festival
 Hollywood Comedy Short Film Festival
 Bentonville Film Festival 
 LA Shorts International Film Festival
 Raindance Film Festival
 Oregon Short Film Festival
 ReelAbilities Film Festival: New York
 San Luis Obispo International Film Festival

References

External links  
 

2018 films
American drama short films
2018 drama films
2018 short films
2010s English-language films
2010s American films